The Vice President of Cameroon was a political position in Federal Republic of Cameroon. It was abolished in 1972 when the new constitution created unitary state United Republic of Cameroon. 
The Vice President of Cameroon was English-speaking and the President of Cameroon was French-speaking during the existence of the office. 

A history of the office holder follows.

References

Politics of Cameroon
Cameroon
Government of Cameroon
1961 establishments in Cameroon
1972 disestablishments in Cameroon